Events during the year 1113 in Italy.

Events
 Republic of Florence conquers the city of Montecascioli

Deaths
 Andrew of Gaeta
 Gregory of San Grisogono

Sources

Years of the 12th century in Italy
Italy
Italy